Laforest railway station is located in the community of Laforest, Ontario, Canada. This station is currently in use by Via Rail. Transcontinental Canadian trains stop here.

External links
 Laforest railway station

Via Rail stations in Ontario
Railway stations in Sudbury District